Proconodontus is an extinct genus of conodonts in the family Proconodontidae. The specimens are found in Cambrian formations.

References

External links 

 

Proconodontida genera
Cambrian conodonts
Paleozoic life of Newfoundland and Labrador

Cambrian genus extinctions